Thomas Knuths (born 31 August 1958 in Schwäbisch Gmünd) is a German former diver who competed in the 1980 Summer Olympics in the 10 metre platform event.

References

1958 births
Living people
German male divers
Olympic divers of East Germany
Divers at the 1980 Summer Olympics
People from Schwäbisch Gmünd
Sportspeople from Stuttgart (region)
20th-century German people